Weralugastenna is a village in Sri Lanka. It is located within Central Province.

External links

Populated places in Matale District